Polavaram is a village in Puthalapattu Mandal, Chittoor district of Andhra Pradesh state.

Politics & Government 
Polavaram gram panchayat is the local self-government of the village. It is divided into wards and each ward is represented by a ward member.

As per the recent panchayat election results Smt. Nirmala Sirasanambati is the current sarpanch of the panchayat and Dasaradharami Reddy S is the upa-sarpanch of the panchayat.

Agriculture 
The major crops in this village are Paddy, Sugarcane, Groundnuts, Mango etc., Majority of the land is utilized for agriculture in this village.

Education 
As per the school information report for the academic year 2020–21, the village has one Mandal Parishad school and one Zilla Parishad school.

 MPP School, Polavaram
 ZP High School, Polavaram

Banks 
Union Bank of India (earlier Andhra Bank) has a branch in this village with branch code 809161 and IFSC as UBIN0809161.

Festivals 
People in this village celebrate the below festivals.

 Makara Sankranthi (aka Pongal) - 3/4 Days
 Ugadi - 1 Day
 Sri Rama Navami - 1/2 Days
 Varalakshmi Vratham - 1 Day
 Vinayaka Chavithi (aka Ganesh Chaturthi) - 3 Days
 Vijaya Dasami (aka Dussehra) - 1 Day
 Deepavali (aka Diwali) - 2 Days
 Karthika Pournami - 1 Day

Tourism Places 

 Kalikiri Konda
 Puligundu
 Kanipakam

References 

Villages in Chittoor district
Polavaram